National Highway 161H, commonly referred to as NH 161H, is a national highway in  India. It is a spur road of National Highway 61. NH-161H traverses the state of Maharashtra in India.

Route 

Jalgaon Jamod - Nandura.

Junctions  

  Terminal near Jalgaon Jamod.
  Terminal near Nandura.

See also 

 List of National Highways in India
 List of National Highways in India by state

References

External links 

 NH 161H on OpenStreetMap

National highways in India
National Highways in Maharashtra